Pete Robbins (born November 28, 1978) is an American jazz saxophonist and composer living in Brooklyn.

He graduated from the New England Conservatory in 2002.

He has performed or recorded with Vijay Iyer, John Hollenbeck, John Zorn, Craig Taborn, Mario Pavone, Tyshawn Sorey, Ben Monder, :de:Dan Weiss, Thomas Morgan, Melvin Sparks, and Kenny Wollesen, and has performed at festivals and clubs in the U.S. and throughout Europe.

For his compositional achievements, Chamber Music America awarded Robbins with their "New Works: Creation and Presentation" grant as well as their "New Works: Encore" award. Robbins was a guest panelist with the Brooklyn Arts Council and is the Dean at the Brooklyn Conservatory of Music.

Discography 
 Centric (Telepathy, 2001)
 Waits & Measures (Playscape, 2006)
 Do the Hate Laugh Shimmy (Fresh Sound, 2008)
 Live in Basel  (Hate Laugh, 2011)
 Pyramid (Hate Laugh, 2014)

References

External links
 Official website
 New York Times review of Do the Hate Laugh Shimmy
 Boston Phoenix review of Do the Hate Laugh Shimmy
 New York Times review of Centric
 Boston Globe article

1978 births
American jazz saxophonists
American male saxophonists
Jazz alto saxophonists
Tufts University alumni
Living people
21st-century American saxophonists
21st-century American male musicians
American male jazz musicians